Seerpadar (also written as Cirpatar or Seerpadam) is a Tamil caste found in the coastal regions of Eastern Province in Sri Lanka. They are traditionally involved in agriculture. They are chiefly found in the Veeramunai, Mandur, Thuraineelavanai, Kalmunai, Kurumanveli and Periye Kallar regions in the Batticaloa and Ampara District.

History

Early History 

The Seerpadar caste derive their name and origin from a Chola queen known as Seerpada Devi, chronicled in inscriptions, copper plates and local poems. According to them, their origin stems from the union of Seerpada Devi and the prince Sittathurai (also known as Balasimhan), the son of king Ukkirasinghan (legendary founder of Jaffna Kingdom). The caste has been recorded in colonial records as being involved in cultivating  activities  and warriors.

Seerpadar's Inscriptions
Veeramunai ceppedu
Thirukkovil ceppedu
Kokkaticholai ceppedu
Thuraineelavanai ceppedu
Thirukonamalai ceppedu

Others
Veeramunai
Kanchikudicharu

References

Sri Lankan Tamil castes